

Pervalka Lighthouse (Lithuanian: Pervalkos švyturys) - a lighthouse located in Pervalka on the Curonian Spit, located in between the Curonian Lagoon (to the east) and the Baltic Sea (to the west); located in Lithuania.

The lighthouse operates automatically - by flashing in a white glare. The lighthouse's base is built on stone; with the lighthouse's cylindrical shape made out of sheet metal - with the current lighthouse built in 1900.

See also

 List of lighthouses in Lithuania

References

Lighthouses completed in 1900
Resort architecture in Lithuania
Lighthouses in Lithuania
Neringa Municipality